is a Japanese pop singer and voice actor who was popular in her native Japan in the mid-to-late 1980s.

Filmography

Kumi Miyasato provided the voice of the pivotal character, Eve Tokimatsuri, in the first two parts of the hit Original Animated Video series, Megazone 23. Her character was a computer-simulated pop idol. Megazone 23 Part 1 was the very second OAV in anime history and the very first to make a profit. It is said that this is largely due to Kumi's vocal performance (both spoken and sung), which is often called by its fans the highlight of the series. She has been said to rival Mari Iijima of The Super Dimension Fortress Macross fame.

Megazone 23 was originally conceived as a standard 26-episode television series. The plot was condensed into two, direct-to-video, 80-minute movies, due to the sponsor pulling out. It is unknown whether Kumi Miyasato would have been cast as Eve or not had the television series been created.

There was also a Part 3 of Megazone 23, but it was a disjointed story that bore little resemblance to what had come before. Eve was the only returning character, but Kumi Miyasato – whether of her own choosing or not is unknown – did not reprise the role.

Likewise, Kumi did not reprise her role as Eve in the 2007 video game, Megazone 23: Aoi Garland.

Kumi recorded five songs for Megazone 23. They are, in order of appearance:

Part 1:

Senaka Goshi ni Sentimental
(Sentimental Behind Our Backs or Sentimental Behind My Back, often incorrectly translated as Sentimental Over the Shoulder)

Tomorrow Blues

Kaze no Lullabye
(The Wind's Lullabye or Lullabye of the Wind, also spelled Kaze no Lullaby and Kaze no RARABAI)

Part 2:

Himitsu Kudasai
(Please Tell Me the Secret)

Lonely Sunset

To date, the first two parts of Megazone 23 are, apparently, Kumi's only acting credits.

Discography

In addition to soundtrack and drama albums from Megazone 23 that were released (and reissused) in Japan, Kumi Miyasato released three original studio albums and two greatest hits albums in Japan:

Hitomi de Whispering~I Only Have Eyes For You (1985)

Allergy (1986)

For You/Kumi Miyasato Best Collection (1986)

Unfinished (1987)

Kumie's Room/Kumi Miyasato Best One (1987)

All of Kumi's solo albums are long out of print.

In addition, a CD single of Senaka Goshi ni Sentimental was packaged with the Japanese DVD release of Megazone 23.

In the United States, the sole Kumi Miyasato release is Senaka Goshi ni Sentimental as a track on The Best of Anime compilation CD from Rhino Entertainment.

Biography

Not much is known about Kumi Miyasato. She landed the role of Eve in Megazone 23 at the young age of 16 and was signed to Victor Records and released a total of five albums. She made various event and radio appearances and was covered in magazines. Everything else is a mystery (including whether she is still alive or not).

There are 2 unconfirmed stories as to why she stopped performing:  By the end of the 1980s, her popularity had diminished considerably, and her contract with Victor Records was not renewed or she got married and retired from singing.

References 

1969 births
Living people
Actresses from Kanagawa Prefecture
Musicians from Kanagawa Prefecture
Anime musicians
20th-century Japanese actresses
20th-century Japanese women singers
20th-century Japanese singers